Zefta  (زفتا) is a village in Nabatieh District, southern Lebanon.

History
In  the 1596 tax records, it was named as a village,  Zafta, in the Ottoman nahiya (subdistrict) of  Sagif   under the liwa' (district) of Safad, with a population of  17 households and 4 bachelors, all Muslim. The villagers paid a fixed  tax-rate of 25 %  on  agricultural products, such as wheat, barley, fruit trees, goats and beehives, in addition to "occasional revenues" and a press for olive oil or grape syrup; a total of 1,740  akçe.

In 1875, Victor Guérin found here a village with 200 Metuali inhabitants.

References

Bibliography

External links
Zefta, Localiban

Populated places in Nabatieh District
Shia Muslim communities in Lebanon